Bolma maestratii is a species of sea snail, a marine gastropod mollusk in the family Turbinidae, the turban snails.

Description

Distribution
This marine species occurs off the Austral Islands and French Polynesia

References

 Alf, A. & Kreipl, K., 2009. - An updated list of the Recent Bolma species (Gastropoda: Turbinidae) with description of two new species from French Polynesia and New Caledonia. Novapex 10(1): 17-24

External links

maestratii
Gastropods described in 2009